Vague Premonition is an album by the Canadian band Elevator Through. The album was released on April 20, 1999, by Sub Pop on CD; it was released in June 1999 by Sonic Unyon on vinyl. Most of the album's songs were recorded in one take.

Critical reception
In its 4-star review, The Stranger called the album "four a.m. bedspin guitar music at its glorious best." Tom Schulte, in AllMusic, wrote: "From the remote stretches of Canada's New Brunswick, Elevator vaults off on a tube-driven journey into inner space—leave your inhibitions behind and get to know yourself." 

Ben Rayner, in the Toronto Star, thought that "Vague Premonition is heavier and more thought-out than the off-the-cuff EPs White originally turned out alone as Elevator to Hell and, while as quiet/loud schizoid as the rest of his output, less prone to loose-limbed, jammy distractions than most of the Elevator recordings that followed, making it the most enjoyable in terms of short-burst journeys to the centre of one's mind." The Telegraph-Journal concluded: "Good, old-fashioned late sixties, journey to the centre of your mind stuff. It's an aural trip with a surprisingly full sound for such a small combo, heavy on the acoustic guitar and organ."

Track list
 "Energy"
 "Rain"
 "The Maze"
 "No Good Trying"
 "Foggy Sea"
 "Early Raining April Moon"
 "The Only See to Thought
 "Comfortable, but Almost"
 "Cut Out the Wick"
 "The Grip on Me"
 "Deep Underground"
 "Fluidmonogleestran"
 "Vague Premonition"

Personnel
Rick White - vocals, guitar

References 

Elevator (band) albums
1999 albums